Milagro Mena Solano (born 30 April 1993) is a Costa Rican racing cyclist, who rides for UCI Women's Continental Team . She rode in the women's road race at the 2015 UCI Road World Championships.

Major results

2015
 1st Overall Vuelta Internacional Femenina a Costa Rica
 National Road Championships
2nd Time trial
3rd Road race
2016
 National Road Championships
1st  Time trial
2nd Road race
 4th Copa Federación Venezolana de Ciclismo
 7th Overall Vuelta Internacional Femenina a Costa Rica
2017
 1st  Time trial, National Road Championships
2018
 National Road Championships
2nd Time trial
2nd Road race
 Central American and Caribbean Games
3rd  Cross-country
9th Road race
 6th Overall Vuelta Internacional Femenina a Costa Rica
 6th Gran Premio Comite Olimpico Nacional Femenino
2019
 1st  Road race, National Road Championships
2021
 1st  Time trial, National Road Championships
 10th Time trial, Pan American Road Championships

References

External links

1993 births
Living people
Costa Rican female cyclists
People from Puntarenas
Cyclists at the 2016 Summer Olympics
Olympic cyclists of Costa Rica
Cyclists at the 2015 Pan American Games
Cyclists at the 2019 Pan American Games
Pan American Games competitors for Costa Rica
21st-century Costa Rican women
Competitors at the 2018 Central American and Caribbean Games